Jerome "Jerry" Rosenberg (May 23, 1937 – June 1, 2009) was a New York State convict, mobster and jail house lawyer. He was incarcerated for 46 years, longer than any other prisoner in New York State history. Rosenberg was sentenced to death for his involvement in the 1962 double homicide of two New York City police officers. His sentence was commuted to life in prison in June 1965, after capital punishment was abolished (save for premeditated murder of law enforcement) in New York. Rosenberg went on to become the first New York State inmate to earn a law degree and in turn gave legal advice to several inmates, including the leaders of the Attica Prison riot. A book was written about Rosenberg and his time in prison which was adapted into a 1988, made-for-TV movie, Doing Life, starring Tony Danza.

Robbery and murder
In 1962, Rosenberg took part in the robbery of Borough Park Tobacco Company in Brooklyn. The robbery was unsuccessful and resulted in the death of two police officers. The previous killing of two New York City police officers had occurred more than three decades earlier. With 1,000 police officers assigned to the double homicide, Rosenberg would eventually turn himself in. Upon conviction of first-degree murder, Rosenberg was to be executed along with his accomplice in the 1962 shooting. Throughout his trial and sentence, Rosenberg claimed innocence of the murders.

Time in prison
In 1964, Rosenberg was to be executed (via the electric chair). Shortly before it was to take place, he was granted a stay of execution by Governor Nelson Rockefeller based on new laws that greatly reduced the use of capital punishment in New York. Four years after Rosenberg's incarceration, he earned a law degree from the Blackstone Career Institute. Prior to Rosenberg, no inmate in the state of New York had ever earned a law degree.

Rosenberg was incarcerated at Attica Correctional Facility at the time of the 1971 rebellion. In the immediate aftermath of the takeover of parts of the prison on September 9, he was one of two men elected to represent C Block on the committee of men who would coordinate action by the insurgent prisoners and take leading roles in the negotiations. Rosenberg was instrumental in articulating demands for immunity from legal and other reprisals. Late on the 9th, in disussions with observers whose presence at Attica had been requested by the rebels, Rosenberg produced a draft of an injunction that, if it could be endorsed by a judge, might prevent state employees retaliating against participants in the revolt after it had ended. That night, observer Herman Schwartz, an attorney and law professor known for his commitment to the cause of prisoner rights, managed to get an injunction against “physical or other administrative reprisals” signed by both the Commissioner of Corrections Russell G. Oswald and, at 3:30 a.m., a Western District judge. However, when Schwartz presented a copy of the document to the men occupying the prison's D Yard, Rosenberg grabbed it and tore it to shreds, arguing not only that it was invalid for lack of the judge's seal, but also that it failed to address the key demand for immunity from criminal prosecution. Over the three days of negotiations that followed, the issue of full amnesty (including protection from criminal charges) proved to be a sticking point, with state officials consistently refusing to countenance the demand. When the insurrection was crushed by an assault by state troopers and corrections officers, Rosenberg was shot in the knee and beaten.

After the riot's resolution, Rosenberg was transferred to Sing Sing Correctional Facility. Circa 1986, Rosenberg was resuscitated when his heart stopped beating during open heart surgery; in 1988, he unsuccessfully argued before a judge that he had died and that this therefore meant that he had served his life sentence. He frequently assisted other prisoners with legal issues as a jailhouse lawyer and estimated he was involved in over 200 lawsuits. Rosenberg was transferred to Wende Correctional Facility in 1991, serving, among other positions within the prison, as paralegal assistant for three years in the law library. Rosenberg was transferred to prison hospital in 2000. He died of natural causes in June 2009 at the age of 72, having served 46 years in state prisons, the longest of any inmate in New York State penal history.

In media
Rosenberg was the subject of a 1982 biography by Stephen Bello called Doing Life: The Extraordinary Saga of America's Greatest Jailhouse Lawyer; in 1988, the book was adapted for an NBC made-for-TV movie called Doing Life with Tony Danza in the role of Rosenberg and Dan Lauria as a prison corections guard/captain. The film omits and avoids and further criminal activity Rosenberg participated in during his incarceration.

Notes

Works cited

Further reading

External links
 

Jewish American gangsters
People convicted of murder by New York (state)
1937 births
2009 deaths
Place of birth missing
20th-century American Jews
21st-century American Jews